The Mausoleum of Omar Khayyam (Persian: آرامگاه عمر خیام ) is a modern mausoleum of white marble erected over Omar Khayyam's headstone located on the south-east of the city of Nishapur, Iran. This mausoleum is a symbol of modern Persian architecture and is part of the national heritage of Iran. This monument was built during the reign of the Pahlavi dynasty and was designed by Hooshang Seyhoun.

The reconstruction of the Mausoleum of Omar Khayyam in Nishapur was commissioned by Reza Shah. Omar's previous tomb was separated from his tomb, and a white marble monument (Current Mausoleum), designed by the Iranian architect Hooshang Seyhoun, was erected over it. This mausoleum became one of the main symbols of the city and one of the known works of the modern Persian architecture. The influence of the architectural design of this mausoleum is visible on the coat of arms of the University of Neyshabur, Neyshabur University of Medical Sciences (NUMS) and other public, civil and private organizations of the city. The construction of the new mausoleum was completed in the year 1963.

History

Omar Khayyam died on 4 December 1131. The earliest account of Omar's final resting place is provided by his pupil Nizami Aruzi who visited his tomb in 1135-6. In Balkh, in 1112-13, Nizami heard Omar make a prophecy about his place of burial, that his grave "would be where flowers in the springtime would shed their petals over his dust". He describes visiting his grave in what was then the cemetery of Hayrah:

[his prophecy] seemed to me impossible, though I knew that one such as he would not speak idle words. When I arrived at Nishapur in the year A.H. 530, it being then four years since that great man had veiled his countenance in the dust, and this nether world had been bereaved of him. Since he was my master, on the eve of a Friday, with a companion, I went to visit his grave in the Hayrah Cemetery, I turned left and saw a grave situated at the foot of a garden-wall, over which pear-trees and peach-trees thrust their heads, and on his grave had fallen so many flower-leaves that his dust was hidden beneath the flowers. This reminded me of the conversation I had heard from him in the city of Balkh, I wept, for in the four corners of the world I had seen no one like him.

The tomb itself survived various calamities; including several major earthquakes (Nishapur being on a seismic fault-line), raids by some Turkic tribes, and the Mongol invasion. In the succeeding centuries, Omar's grave had become situated in an open wing of a shrine of a certain Islamic saint called Imamzadeh Muhammad Mahruk (d. eighth century), the brother of Reza. According to Percy Sykes, who visited the poet's tomb twice, the saint's mortuary shrine contained a formal Persian garden with cobbled paths. The shrine had a turquoise dome and was likely erected in the seventeenth century, or possibly earlier by Shah Abbas. Some pilgrims to Omar's grave, such as the Iranologist, A. V. Williams Jackson who visited it in 1911, described his tomb as a simple case made of brick and cement with no inscription.

Reconstruction 

The reconstruction of the mausoleum was commissioned by the Iranian government (Reza Shah) in 1934 during Ferdowsi's millenary. Omar's tomb was separated from the shrine, and a white marble monument, designed by the architect Hooshang Seyhoun, was erected over it. The construction was completed in 1963.

Gallery

References

External links
Arch Net
Panoramic Images of Khayyam’s Tomb، Neyshabur Day 

Buildings and structures in Nishapur
Omar Khayyam
Architecture in Iran
Buildings and structures in Razavi Khorasan Province
Tourist attractions in Razavi Khorasan Province
Omar
Hooshang Seyhoun buildings